Périgny may refer to:

Canada
 Périgny River, a tributary of the O'Sullivan River in Quebec

France
Périgny, Allier
Périgny, Calvados
Périgny, Charente-Maritime
Périgny, Loir-et-Cher
Périgny, Val-de-Marne
Périgny-la-Rose, in the Aube département

See also 
 Perrigny (disambiguation)